Marianna Carlevarijs (1703 – 1750) was an Italian painter, active mainly in Venice, creating pastel portraits.

Biography
Marianna was the daughter of the prominent Venetian painter of vedute, Luca Carlevarijs. She was a friend, and pupil in the style and subject matter, of Rosalba Carriera.

Works
Portrait of Girolamo Maria Balbi, sala dei pastelli, Ca Rezzonico Museum, Venice
Portrait of Cornelia Foscolo Balbi, sala dei pastelli, Ca Rezzonico Museum, Venice
Portrait of Marco e Caterina Balbi, sala dei pastelli, Ca Rezzonico Museum, Venice
Portrait of a Young Woman, Private Collection
Portrait of Unknown Gentleman
Allegory of Peace, Museo Civici of Vicenza

References

1703 births
1750 deaths
18th-century Italian painters
Italian women painters
Italian portrait painters
Pastel artists
Painters from Venice
18th-century Venetian people
18th-century Italian women artists
18th-century Venetian women